Édouard Meunier (born 1894, date of death unknown) was a French cyclist. He competed in the 50km event at the 1924 Summer Olympics.

References

External links
 

1894 births
Year of death missing
French male cyclists
Olympic cyclists of France
Cyclists at the 1924 Summer Olympics
Place of birth missing